UEFI (Unified Extensible Firmware Interface) is a set of specifications written by the UEFI Forum. They define the architecture of the platform firmware used for booting and its interface for interaction with the operating system. Examples of firmware that implement these specifications are AMI Aptio, Phoenix SecureCore Tiano, TianoCore EDK II and InsydeH2O.

UEFI replaces the BIOS which was present in the boot ROM of all personal computers that are IBM PC-compatible, although it can provide backwards compatibility with the BIOS using CSM booting. Intel developed the original Extensible Firmware Interface (EFI) specifications. Some of the EFI's practices and data formats mirror those of Microsoft Windows. In 2005, UEFI deprecated EFI 1.10 (the final release of EFI).

UEFI is independent of platform and programming language, but C is used for the reference implementation TianoCore EDKII.

History 
The original motivation for EFI came during early development of the first Intel–HP Itanium systems in the mid-1990s. BIOS limitations (such as 16-bit real mode, 1MB addressable memory space, assembly language programming, and PC AT hardware) had become too restrictive for the larger server platforms Itanium was targeting. The effort to address these concerns began in 1998 and was initially called Intel Boot Initiative. It was later renamed to Extensible Firmware Interface (EFI).

The first open source UEFI implementation, Tiano, was released by Intel in 2004. Tiano has since then been superseded by EDK and EDK2 and is now maintained by the TianoCore community.

In July 2005, Intel ceased its development of the EFI specification at version 1.10, and contributed it to the Unified EFI Forum, which has developed the specification as the Unified Extensible Firmware Interface (UEFI). The original EFI specification remains owned by Intel, which exclusively provides licenses for EFI-based products, but the UEFI specification is owned by the UEFI Forum.

Version 2.0 of the UEFI specification was released on 31 January 2006. It added cryptography and security.

Version 2.1 of the UEFI specification was released on 7 January 2007. It added network authentication and the user interface architecture ('Human Interface Infrastructure' in UEFI).

In October 2018, Arm announced Arm ServerReady, a compliance certification program for landing the generic off-the-shelf operating systems and hypervisors on Arm-based servers. The program requires the system firmware to comply with Server Base Boot Requirements (SBBR). SBBR requires UEFI, ACPI and SMBIOS compliance. In October 2020, Arm announced the extension of the program to the edge and IoT market. The new program name is Arm SystemReady. Arm SystemReady defined the Base Boot Requirements (BBR) specification that currently provides three recipes, two of which are related to UEFI: 1) SBBR: which requires UEFI, ACPI and SMBIOS compliance suitable for enterprise level operating environments such as Windows, Red Hat Enterprise Linux, and VMware ESXi; and 2) EBBR: which requires compliance to a set of UEFI interfaces as defined in the Embedded Base Boot Requirements (EBBR) suitable for embedded environments such as Yocto. Many Linux and BSD distros can support both recipes.

In December 2018, Microsoft announced Project Mu, a fork of TianoCore EDK2 used in Microsoft Surface and Hyper-V products. The project promotes the idea of Firmware as a Service.

The latest UEFI specification, version 2.10, was published in August 2022.

Advantages 
The interface defined by the EFI specification includes data tables that contain platform information, and boot and runtime services that are available to the OS loader and OS. UEFI firmware provides several technical advantages over a traditional BIOS system:

 Ability to boot a disk containing large partitions (over 2 TB) with a GUID Partition Table (GPT)
 Flexible pre-OS environment, including network capability, GUI, multi language
 32-bit (for example IA-32, ARM32) or 64-bit (for example x64, AArch64) pre-OS environment
 C language programming
 Modular design
 Backward and forward compatibility

Compatibility

Processor compatibility 
As of version 2.5, processor bindings exist for Itanium, x86, x86-64, ARM (AArch32) and ARM64 (AArch64). Only little-endian processors can be supported. Unofficial UEFI support is under development for POWERPC64 by implementing TianoCore on top of OPAL, the OpenPOWER abstraction layer, running in little-endian mode. Similar projects exist for MIPS and RISC-V. As of UEFI 2.7, RISC-V processor bindings have been officially established for 32-, 64- and 128-bit modes.

Standard PC BIOS is limited to a 16-bit processor mode and 1 MB of addressable memory space, resulting from the design based on the IBM 5150 that used a 16-bit Intel 8088 processor. In comparison, the processor mode in a UEFI environment can be either 32-bit (x86-32, AArch32) or 64-bit (x86-64, Itanium, and AArch64). 64-bit UEFI firmware implementations support long mode, which allows applications in the preboot environment to use 64-bit addressing to get direct access to all of the machine's memory.

UEFI requires the firmware and operating system loader (or kernel) to be size-matched; that is, a 64-bit UEFI firmware implementation can load only a 64-bit operating system (OS) boot loader or kernel (unless the CSM-based Legacy boot is used) and the same applies to 32-bit. After the system transitions from "Boot Services" to "Runtime Services", the operating system kernel takes over. At this point, the kernel can change processor modes if it desires, but this bars usage of the runtime services (unless the kernel switches back again). As of version 3.15, the Linux kernel supports 64-bit kernels to be booted on 32-bit UEFI firmware implementations running on x86-64 CPUs, with UEFI handover support from a UEFI boot loader as the requirement. UEFI handover protocol deduplicates the UEFI initialization code between the kernel and UEFI boot loaders, leaving the initialization to be performed only by the Linux kernel's UEFI boot stub.

Disk device compatibility 

In addition to the standard PC disk partition scheme that uses a master boot record (MBR), UEFI also works with the GUID Partition Table (GPT) partitioning scheme, which is free from many of the limitations of MBR. More specifically, GPT allows for a maximum disk and partition size of 8 ZB .

Linux 

Support for GPT in Linux is enabled by turning on the option CONFIG_EFI_PARTITION (EFI GUID Partition Support) during kernel configuration. This option allows Linux to recognize and use GPT disks after the system firmware passes control over the system to Linux.

For reverse compatibility, Linux can use GPT disks in BIOS-based systems for both data storage and booting, as both GRUB 2 and Linux are GPT-aware. Such a setup is usually referred to as BIOS-GPT. As GPT incorporates the protective MBR, a BIOS-based computer can boot from a GPT disk using a GPT-aware boot loader stored in the protective MBR's bootstrap code area. In the case of GRUB, such a configuration requires a BIOS boot partition for GRUB to embed its second-stage code due to absence of the post-MBR gap in GPT partitioned disks (which is taken over by the GPT's Primary Header and Primary Partition Table). From GRUB's perspective, no such partition type exists in case of MBR partitioning. This partition is not required if the system is UEFI-based because no embedding of the second-stage code is needed in that case.

UEFI systems can access GPT disks and boot directly from them, which allows Linux to use UEFI boot methods. Booting Linux from GPT disks on UEFI systems involves creation of an EFI system partition (ESP), which contains UEFI applications such as bootloaders, operating system kernels, and utility software. Such a setup is usually referred to as UEFI-GPT, while ESP is recommended to be at least 512 MB in size and formatted with a FAT32 filesystem for maximum compatibility.

For backward compatibility, some UEFI implementations also support booting from MBR-partitioned disks through the Compatibility Support Module (CSM) that provides legacy BIOS compatibility. In that case, booting Linux on UEFI systems is the same as on legacy BIOS-based systems.

Microsoft Windows 
The 64-bit versions of Windows Vista SP1 and later and 32-bit versions of Windows 8, 8.1, and 10 can boot from a GPT disk that is larger than 2 TB.

Features

Services 

EFI defines two types of services: boot services and runtime services. Boot services are available only while the firmware owns the platform (i.e., before the ExitBootServices() call), and they include text and graphical consoles on various devices, and bus, block and file services. Runtime services are still accessible while the operating system is running; they include services such as date, time and NVRAM access.

 Graphics Output Protocol (GOP) services
 The Graphics Output Protocol (GOP) provides runtime services; see also Graphics features section below. The operating system is permitted to directly write to the framebuffer provided by GOP during runtime mode.

 UEFI Memory map services

 SMM services

 ACPI services

 SMBIOS services

 Device tree services (for RISC processors)

 Variable services
 UEFI variables provide a way to store data, in particular non-volatile data. Some UEFI variables are shared between platform firmware and operating systems. Variable namespaces are identified by GUIDs, and variables are key/value pairs. For example, UEFI variables can be used to keep crash messages in NVRAM after a crash for the operating system to retrieve after a reboot.

 Time services
 UEFI provides time services. Time services include support for time zone and daylight saving fields, which allow the hardware real-time clock to be set to local time or UTC. On machines using a PC-AT real-time clock, by default the hardware clock still has to be set to local time for compatibility with BIOS-based Windows, unless using recent versions and an entry in the Windows registry is set to indicate the use of UTC.

Applications 

Beyond loading an OS, UEFI can run UEFI applications, which reside as files on the EFI System Partition. They can be executed from the UEFI Shell, by the firmware's boot manager, or by other UEFI applications. UEFI applications can be developed and installed independently of the original equipment manufacturers (OEMs).

A type of UEFI application is an OS boot loader such as GRUB, rEFInd, Gummiboot, and Windows Boot Manager; which loads some OS files into memory and executes them. Also, an OS boot loader can provide a user interface to allow the selection of another UEFI application to run. Utilities like the UEFI Shell are also UEFI applications.

Protocols 
EFI defines protocols as a set of software interfaces used for communication between two binary modules. All EFI drivers must provide services to others via protocols. The EFI Protocols are similar to the BIOS interrupt calls.

Device drivers 
In addition to standard instruction set architecture-specific device drivers, EFI provides for a ISA-independent device driver stored in non-volatile memory as EFI byte code or EBC. System firmware has an interpreter for EBC images. In that sense, EBC is analogous to Open Firmware, the ISA-independent firmware used in PowerPC-based Apple Macintosh and Sun Microsystems SPARC computers, among others.

Some architecture-specific (non-EFI Byte Code) EFI drivers for some device types can have interfaces for use by the OS. This allows the OS to rely on EFI for drivers to perform basic graphics and network functions before, and if, operating-system-specific drivers are loaded.

In other cases, the EFI driver can be filesystem drivers that allow for booting from other types of disk volumes. Examples include efifs for 37 file systems (based on GRUB2 code), used by Rufus for chain-loading NTFS ESPs.

Graphics features 
The EFI 1.0 specification defined a UGA (Universal Graphic Adapter) protocol as a way to support graphics features. UEFI did not include UGA and replaced it with GOP (Graphics Output Protocol).

UEFI 2.1 defined a "Human Interface Infrastructure" (HII) to manage user input, localized strings, fonts, and forms (in the HTML sense). These enable original equipment manufacturers (OEMs) or independent BIOS vendors (IBVs) to design graphical interfaces for pre-boot configuration.

Most early UEFI firmware implementations were console-based. Today many UEFI firmware implementations are GUI-based.

EFI system partition 

An EFI system partition, often abbreviated to ESP, is a data storage device partition that is used in computers adhering to the UEFI specification. Accessed by the UEFI firmware when a computer is powered up, it stores UEFI applications and the files these applications need to run, including operating system boot loaders. Supported partition table schemes include MBR and GPT, as well as El Torito volumes on optical discs. For use on ESPs, UEFI defines a specific version of the FAT file system, which is maintained as part of the UEFI specification and independently from the original FAT specification, encompassing the FAT32, FAT16 and FAT12 file systems. The ESP also provides space for a boot sector as part of the backward BIOS compatibility.

Booting

UEFI booting 
Unlike the legacy PC BIOS, UEFI does not rely on boot sectors, defining instead a boot manager as part of the UEFI specification. When a computer is powered on, the boot manager checks the boot configuration and, based on its settings, then executes the specified OS boot loader or operating system kernel (usually boot loader). The boot configuration is defined by variables stored in NVRAM, including variables that indicate the file system paths to OS loaders or OS kernels.

OS boot loaders can be automatically detected by UEFI, which enables easy booting from removable devices such as USB flash drives. This automated detection relies on standardized file paths to the OS boot loader, with the path varying depending on the computer architecture.

Booting UEFI systems from GPT-partitioned disks is commonly called UEFI-GPT booting. Despite the fact that the UEFI specification requires MBR partition tables to be fully supported, some UEFI firmware implementations immediately switch to the BIOS-based CSM booting depending on the type of boot disk's partition table, effectively preventing UEFI booting to be performed from EFI System Partition on MBR-partitioned disks. Such a boot scheme is commonly called UEFI-MBR.

It is also common for a boot manager to have a textual user interface so the user can select the desired OS (or setup utility) from a list of available boot options.

CSM booting 
To ensure backward compatibility, UEFI firmware implementations on PC-class machines could support booting in legacy BIOS mode from MBR-partitioned disks through the Compatibility Support Module (CSM) that provides legacy BIOS compatibility. In this scenario, booting is performed in the same way as on legacy BIOS-based systems, by ignoring the partition table and relying on the content of a boot sector.

BIOS-style booting from MBR-partitioned disks is commonly called BIOS-MBR, regardless of it being performed on UEFI or legacy BIOS-based systems. Furthermore, booting legacy BIOS-based systems from GPT disks is also possible, and such a boot scheme is commonly called BIOS-GPT.

The Compatibility Support Module allows legacy operating systems and some legacy option ROMs that do not support UEFI to still be used. It also provides required legacy System Management Mode (SMM) functionality, called CompatibilitySmm, as an addition to features provided by the UEFI SMM. An example of such a legacy SMM functionality is providing USB legacy support for keyboard and mouse, by emulating their classic PS/2 counterparts.

In November 2017, Intel announced that it planned to phase out support for CSM by 2020.

In July, of 2022, Kaspersky Labs published information regarding a Rootkit designed to chain boot malicious code on machines using Intel's H81 chipset and the Compatibility Support module of affected motherboards.

Network booting 
The UEFI specification includes support for booting over network via the Preboot eXecution Environment (PXE). PXE booting network protocols include Internet Protocol (IPv4 and IPv6), User Datagram Protocol (UDP), Dynamic Host Configuration Protocol (DHCP), Trivial File Transfer Protocol (TFTP) and iSCSI.

OS images can be remotely stored on storage area networks (SANs), with Internet Small Computer System Interface (iSCSI) and Fibre Channel over Ethernet (FCoE) as supported protocols for accessing the SANs.

Version 2.5 of the UEFI specification adds support for accessing boot images over the HTTP protocol.

Secure Boot 

The UEFI specification defines a protocol known as Secure Boot, which can secure the boot process by preventing the loading of UEFI drivers or OS boot loaders that are not signed with an acceptable digital signature. The mechanical details of how precisely these drivers are to be signed are not specified. When Secure Boot is enabled, it is initially placed in "setup" mode, which allows a public key known as the "platform key" (PK) to be written to the firmware. Once the key is written, Secure Boot enters "User" mode, where only UEFI drivers and OS boot loaders signed with the platform key can be loaded by the firmware. Additional "key exchange keys" (KEK) can be added to a database stored in memory to allow other certificates to be used, but they must still have a connection to the private portion of the platform key. Secure Boot can also be placed in "Custom" mode, where additional public keys can be added to the system that do not match the private key.

Secure Boot is supported by Windows 8 and 8.1, Windows Server 2012 and 2012 R2, Windows 10, Windows Server 2016, 2019, and 2022, and Windows 11, VMware vSphere 6.5 and a number of Linux distributions including Fedora (since version 18), openSUSE (since version 12.3), RHEL (since version 7), CentOS (since version 7), Debian (since version 10), and Ubuntu (since version 12.04.2). , FreeBSD support is in a planning stage.

UEFI shell 

UEFI provides a shell environment, which can be used to execute other UEFI applications, including UEFI boot loaders. Apart from that, commands available in the UEFI shell can be used for obtaining various other information about the system or the firmware, including getting the memory map (memmap), modifying boot manager variables (bcfg), running partitioning programs (diskpart), loading UEFI drivers, and editing text files (edit).

Source code for a UEFI shell can be downloaded from the Intel's TianoCore UDK/EDK2 project. A pre-built ShellBinPkg is also available. Shell v2 works best in UEFI 2.3+ systems and is recommended over Shell v1 in those systems. Shell v1 should work in all UEFI systems.

Methods used for launching UEFI shell depend on the manufacturer and model of the system motherboard. Some of them already provide a direct option in firmware setup for launching, e.g. compiled x86-64 version of the shell needs to be made available as <EFI_SYSTEM_PARTITION>/SHELLX64.EFI. Some other systems have an already embedded UEFI shell which can be launched by appropriate key press combinations. For other systems, the solution is either creating an appropriate USB flash drive or adding manually (bcfg) a boot option associated with the compiled version of shell.

Commands
The following is a list of commands supported by the EFI shell.

 alias
 attrib
 bcfg
 cd
 cls
 comp
 cp
 date
 dblk
 dh
 dmpstore
 echo
 Edd30
 EddDebug
 edit
 err
 guid
 help
 load
 ls
 map
 mem
 memmap
 mkdir
 mm
 mode
 mount
 pause
 pci
 reset
 rm
 set
 stall
 time
 type
 unload
 ver
 vol

Extensions 
Extensions to UEFI can be loaded from virtually any non-volatile storage device attached to the computer. For example, an original equipment manufacturer (OEM) can distribute systems with an EFI system partition on the hard drive, which would add additional functions to the standard UEFI firmware stored on the motherboard's ROM.

UEFI Capsule 
UEFI Capsule defines a Firmware-to-OS firmware update interface, marketed as modern and secure. Windows 8, Windows 8.1, Windows 10, and Fwupd for Linux each support the UEFI Capsule.

Hardware 
Like BIOS, UEFI initializes and tests system hardware components (e.g. Memory training, PCIe link training, USB link training), and then loads the boot loader from a mass storage device or through a network connection. In x86 systems, the UEFI firmware is usually stored in the NOR flash chip of the motherboard.

Classes 
UEFI machines can have one of the following classes, which were used to help ease the transition to UEFI:

 Class 0: Legacy BIOS
 Class 1: UEFI with a CSM interface and no external UEFI interface. The only UEFI interfaces are internal to the firmware.
 Class 2: UEFI with CSM and external UEFI interfaces
 Class 3: UEFI without a CSM interface and with an external UEFI interface
 Class 3+: UEFI class 3 that has Secure Boot enabled

Starting from the 10th Gen Intel Core, Intel no longer provides Legacy Video BIOS for the iGPU (Intel Graphics Technology). Legacy boot with those CPUs requires a Legacy Video BIOS, which can still be provided by a video card.

Boot stages

SEC – Security Phase 
This is the first stage of the UEFI boot but may have platform specific binary code that precedes it. (e.g., Intel ME, AMD PSP, CPU microcode). It consists of minimal code written in assembly language for the specific architecture. It initializes a temporary memory (often CPU cache as RAM) and serves as the system's software root of trust with the option of verifying PEI before hand-off.

PEI – Pre-EFI Initialization 
The second stage of UEFI boot consists of a dependency-aware dispatcher that loads and runs PEI modules (PEIMs) to handle early hardware initialization tasks such as main memory initialization and firmware recovery operations. Additionally, it is responsible for discovery of the current boot mode and handling many ACPI S0ix/ACPI S3 operations. In the case of ACPI S0ix/ACPI S3 resume, it is responsible for restoring many hardware registers to a pre-sleep state. PEI also uses CPU cache as RAM.

DXE – Driver Execution Environment 
This stage consist of C modules and a dependency-aware dispatcher. With main memory now available, CPU, chipset, mainboard and boot devices are initialized in DXE and BDS.

BDS – Boot Device Select 
BDS is a part of the DXE. In this stage, boot devices are initialized, UEFI drivers or Option ROMs of PCI devices are executed according to system configuration, and boot options are processed.

TSL – Transient System Load 
This is the stage between boot device selection and hand-off to the OS. At this point one may enter UEFI shell, or execute an UEFI application such as the OS boot loader.

RT – Runtime 
The UEFI hands off to the operating system (OS) after  is executed. A UEFI compatible OS is now responsible for exiting boot services triggering the firmware to unload all no longer needed code and data, leaving only runtime services code/data, e.g. SMM and ACPI. A typical modern OS will prefer to use its own programs (such as kernel drivers) to control hardware devices.

When a legacy OS is used, CSM will handle this call ensuring the system is compatible with legacy BIOS expectations.

Usage

Implementations 

Intel's implementation of EFI is the Intel Platform Innovation Framework, codenamed Tiano. Tiano runs on Intel's XScale, Itanium, x86-32 and x86-64 processors, and is proprietary software, although a portion of the code has been released under the BSD license or Eclipse Public License (EPL) as TianoCore EDK II. TianoCore can be used as a payload for coreboot.

Phoenix Technologies' implementation of UEFI is branded as SecureCore Technology (SCT). American Megatrends offers its own UEFI firmware implementation known as Aptio, while Insyde Software offers InsydeH2O.

In December 2018, Microsoft released an open source version of its TianoCore EDK2-based UEFI implementation from the Surface line, Project Mu.

An implementation of the UEFI API was introduced into the Universal Boot Loader (Das U-Boot) in 2017. On the ARMv8 architecture Linux distributions use the U-Boot UEFI implementation in conjunction with GNU GRUB for booting (e.g. SUSE Linux), the same holds true for OpenBSD. For booting from iSCSI iPXE can be used as a UEFI application loaded by U-Boot.

Platforms 
Intel's first Itanium workstations and servers, released in 2000, implemented EFI 1.02.

Hewlett-Packard's first Itanium 2 systems, released in 2002, implemented EFI 1.10; they were able to boot Windows, Linux, FreeBSD and HP-UX; OpenVMS added UEFI capability in June 2003.

In January 2006, Apple Inc. shipped its first Intel-based Macintosh computers. These systems used EFI instead of Open Firmware, which had been used on its previous PowerPC-based systems. On 5 April 2006, Apple first released Boot Camp, which produces a Windows drivers disk and a non-destructive partitioning tool to allow the installation of Windows XP or Vista without requiring a reinstallation of Mac OS X. A firmware update was also released that added BIOS compatibility to its EFI implementation. Subsequent Macintosh models shipped with the newer firmware.

During 2005, more than one million Intel systems shipped with Intel's implementation of UEFI. New mobile, desktop and server products, using Intel's implementation of UEFI, started shipping in 2006. For instance, boards that use the Intel 945 chipset series use Intel's UEFI firmware implementation.

Since 2005, EFI has also been implemented on non-PC architectures, such as embedded systems based on XScale cores.

The EDK (EFI Developer Kit) includes an NT32 target, which allows EFI firmware and EFI applications to run within a Windows application. But no direct hardware access is allowed by EDK NT32. This means only a subset of EFI application and drivers can be executed by the EDK NT32 target.

In 2008, more x86-64 systems adopted UEFI. While many of these systems still allow booting only the BIOS-based OSes via the Compatibility Support Module (CSM) (thus not appearing to the user to be UEFI-based), other systems started to allow booting UEFI-based OSes. For example, IBM x3450 server, MSI motherboards with ClickBIOS, HP EliteBook Notebook PCs.

In 2009, IBM shipped System x machines (x3550 M2, x3650 M2, iDataPlex dx360 M2) and BladeCenter HS22 with UEFI capability. Dell shipped PowerEdge T610, R610, R710, M610 and M710 servers with UEFI capability. More commercially available systems are mentioned in a UEFI whitepaper.

In 2011, major vendors (such as ASRock, Asus, Gigabyte, and MSI) launched several consumer-oriented motherboards using the Intel 6-series LGA 1155 chipset and AMD 9 Series AM3+ chipsets with UEFI.

With the release of Windows 8 in October 2012, Microsoft's certification requirements now require that computers include firmware that implements the UEFI specification. Furthermore, if the computer supports the "Connected Standby" feature of Windows 8 (which allows devices to have power management comparable to smartphones, with an almost instantaneous return from standby mode), then the firmware is not permitted to contain a Compatibility Support Module (CSM). As such, systems that support Connected Standby are incapable of booting Legacy BIOS operating systems.

In October 2017, Intel announced that it would remove legacy PC BIOS support from all its products by 2020, in favor of UEFI Class 3.

Operating systems 
An operating system that can be booted from a (U)EFI is called a (U)EFI-aware operating system, defined by (U)EFI specification. Here the term booted from a (U)EFI means directly booting the system using a (U)EFI operating system loader stored on any storage device. The default location for the operating system loader is <EFI_SYSTEM_PARTITION>/BOOT/BOOT<MACHINE_TYPE_SHORT_NAME>.EFI, where short name of the machine type can be IA32, X64, IA64, ARM or AA64. Some operating systems vendors may have their own boot loaders. They may also change the default boot location.

 The Linux kernel has been able to use EFI at boot time since early 2000s, using the elilo EFI boot loader or, more recently, EFI versions of GRUB. Grub+Linux also supports booting from a GUID partition table without UEFI. The distribution Ubuntu added support for UEFI Secure Boot as of version 12.10. Furthermore, the Linux kernel can be compiled with the option to run as an EFI bootloader on its own through the EFI bootstub feature.
 HP-UX has used (U)EFI as its boot mechanism on IA-64 systems since 2002.
 OpenVMS has used EFI on IA-64 since its initial evaluation release in December 2003, and for production releases since January 2005. The x86-64 port of OpenVMS also uses UEFI to boot the operating system.
 Apple uses EFI for its line of Intel-based Macs. Mac OS X v10.4 Tiger and Mac OS X v10.5 Leopard implement EFI v1.10 in 32-bit mode even on newer 64-bit CPUs, but full support arrived with OS X v10.8 Mountain Lion.
 The Itanium versions of Windows 2000 (Advanced Server Limited Edition and Datacenter Server Limited Edition) implemented EFI 1.10 in 2002. MS Windows Server 2003 for IA-64, MS Windows XP 64-bit Edition and Windows 2000 Advanced Server Limited Edition, all of which are for the Intel Itanium family of processors, implement EFI, a requirement of the platform through the DIG64 specification.
 Microsoft introduced UEFI for x64 Windows operating systems with Windows Vista SP1 and Windows Server 2008 however only UGA (Universal Graphic Adapter) 1.1 or Legacy BIOS INT 10h is supported; Graphics Output Protocol (GOP) is not supported. Therefore, PCs running 64-bit versions of Windows Vista SP1, Windows Vista SP2, Windows 7, Windows Server 2008 and Windows Server 2008 R2 are compatible with UEFI Class 2. 32-bit UEFI was originally not supported since vendors did not have any interest in producing native 32-bit UEFI firmware because of the mainstream status of 64-bit computing. Windows 8 finally introduced further optimizations for UEFI systems, including Graphics Output Protocol (GOP) support, a faster startup, 32-bit UEFI support, and Secure Boot support. Microsoft began requiring UEFI to run Windows with Windows 11.
 On 5 March 2013, the FreeBSD Foundation awarded a grant to a developer seeking to add UEFI support to the FreeBSD kernel and bootloader. The changes were initially stored in a discrete branch of the FreeBSD source code, but were merged into the mainline source on 4 April 2014 (revision 264095); the changes include support in the installer as well. UEFI boot support for amd64 first appeared in FreeBSD 10.1 and for arm64 in FreeBSD 11.0.
 Oracle Solaris 11.1 and later support UEFI boot for x86 systems with UEFI firmware version 2.1 or later. GRUB 2 is used as the boot loader on x86.
 OpenBSD 5.9 introduced UEFI boot support for 64-bit x86 systems using its own custom loader, OpenBSD 6.0 extended that support to include ARMv7.

With virtualization 
 HP Integrity Virtual Machines provides UEFI boot on HP Integrity Servers. It also provides a virtualized UEFI environment for the guest UEFI-aware OSes.
 Intel hosts an Open Virtual Machine Firmware project on SourceForge.
 VMware Fusion 3 software for Mac OS X can boot Mac OS X Server virtual machines using UEFI.
 VMware Workstation prior to version 11 unofficially supports UEFI, but is manually enabled by editing the .vmx file. VMware Workstation version 11 and above supports UEFI, independently of whether the physical host system is UEFI-based. VMware Workstation 14 (and accordingly, Fusion 10) adds support for the Secure Boot feature of UEFI.
 The vSphere ESXi 5.0 hypervisor officially supports UEFI. Version 6.5 adds support for Secure Boot.
 VirtualBox has implemented UEFI since 3.1, but is limited to Unix/Linux operating systems and Windows 8 and later (does not work with Windows Vista x64 and Windows 7 x64).
 QEMU/KVM can be used with the Open Virtual Machine Firmware (OVMF) provided by TianoCore.
 The VMware ESXi version 5 hypervisor, part of VMware vSphere, supports virtualized UEFI as an alternative to the legacy PC BIOS inside a virtual machine.
 The second generation of the Microsoft Hyper-V virtual machine supports virtualized UEFI.
 Google Cloud Platform Shielded VMs support virtualized UEFI to enable Secure Boot.

Applications development 
EDK2 Application Development Kit (EADK) makes it possible to use standard C library functions in UEFI applications. EADK can be freely downloaded from the Intel's TianoCore UDK / EDK2 SourceForge project. As an example, a port of the Python interpreter is made available as a UEFI application by using the EADK. The development has moved to GitHub since UDK2015.

A minimalistic "hello, world" C program written using EADK looks similar to its usual C counterpart:

#include <Uefi.h>
#include <Library/UefiLib.h>
#include <Library/ShellCEntryLib.h>

EFI_STATUS EFIAPI ShellAppMain(IN UINTN Argc, IN CHAR16 **Argv)
{
    Print(L"hello, world\n");
    return EFI_SUCCESS;
}

Criticism 
Numerous digital rights activists have protested against UEFI.
Ronald G. Minnich, a co-author of coreboot, and Cory Doctorow, a digital rights activist, have criticized UEFI as an attempt to remove the ability of the user to truly control the computer. It does not solve the BIOS's long-standing problems of requiring two different drivers—one for the firmware and one for the operating system—for most hardware.

Open-source project TianoCore also provides UEFI interfaces. TianoCore lacks the specialized drivers that initialize chipset functions, which are instead provided by coreboot, of which TianoCore is one of many payload options. The development of coreboot requires cooperation from chipset manufacturers to provide the specifications needed to develop initialization drivers.

Secure Boot 

In 2011, Microsoft announced that computers certified to run its Windows 8 operating system had to ship with Microsoft's public key enrolled and Secure Boot enabled. Following the announcement, the company was accused by critics and free software/open source advocates (including the Free Software Foundation) of trying to use the Secure Boot functionality of UEFI to hinder or outright prevent the installation of alternative operating systems such as Linux. Microsoft denied that the Secure Boot requirement was intended to serve as a form of lock-in, and clarified its requirements by stating that x86-based systems certified for Windows 8 must allow Secure Boot to enter custom mode or be disabled, but not on systems using the ARM architecture. Windows 10 allows OEMs to decide whether or not Secure Boot can be managed by users of their x86 systems.

Other developers raised concerns about the legal and practical issues of implementing support for Secure Boot on Linux systems in general. Former Red Hat developer Matthew Garrett noted that conditions in the GNU General Public License version 3 may prevent the use of the GNU GRand Unified Bootloader without a distribution's developer disclosing the private key (however, the Free Software Foundation has since clarified its position, assuring that the responsibility to make keys available was held by the hardware manufacturer), and that it would also be difficult for advanced users to build custom kernels that could function with Secure Boot enabled without self-signing them. Other developers suggested that signed builds of Linux with another key could be provided, but noted that it would be difficult to persuade OEMs to ship their computers with the required key alongside the Microsoft key.

Several major Linux distributions have developed different implementations for Secure Boot. Garrett himself developed a minimal bootloader known as a shim, which is a precompiled, signed bootloader that allows the user to individually trust keys provided by Linux distributions. Ubuntu 12.10 uses an older version of shim pre-configured for use with Canonical's own key that verifies only the bootloader and allows unsigned kernels to be loaded; developers believed that the practice of signing only the bootloader is more feasible, since a trusted kernel is effective at securing only the user space, and not the pre-boot state for which Secure Boot is designed to add protection. That also allows users to build their own kernels and use custom kernel modules as well, without the need to reconfigure the system. Canonical also maintains its own private key to sign installations of Ubuntu pre-loaded on certified OEM computers that run the operating system, and also plans to enforce a Secure Boot requirement as wellrequiring both a Canonical key and a Microsoft key (for compatibility reasons) to be included in their firmware. Fedora also uses shim, but requires that both the kernel and its modules be signed as well.

It has been disputed whether the operating system kernel and its modules must be signed as well; while the UEFI specifications do not require it, Microsoft has asserted that their contractual requirements do, and that it reserves the right to revoke any certificates used to sign code that can be used to compromise the security of the system. In Windows, only WHQL kernel driver is allowed if Secure Boot enabled. In February 2013, another Red Hat developer attempted to submit a patch to the Linux kernel that would allow it to parse Microsoft's authenticode signing using a master X.509 key embedded in PE files signed by Microsoft. However, the proposal was criticized by Linux creator Linus Torvalds, who attacked Red Hat for supporting Microsoft's control over the Secure Boot infrastructure.

On 26 March 2013, the Spanish free software development group Hispalinux filed a formal complaint with the European Commission, contending that Microsoft's Secure Boot requirements on OEM systems were "obstructive" and anti-competitive.

At the Black Hat conference in August 2013, a group of security researchers presented a series of exploits in specific vendor implementations of UEFI that could be used to exploit Secure Boot.

In August 2016 it was reported that two security researchers had found the "golden key" security key Microsoft uses in signing operating systems. Technically, no key was exposed, however, an exploitable binary signed by the key was. This allows any software to run as though it was genuinely signed by Microsoft and exposes the possibility of rootkit and bootkit attacks. This also makes patching the fault impossible, since any patch can be replaced (downgraded) by the (signed) exploitable binary. Microsoft responded in a statement that the vulnerability only exists in ARM architecture and Windows RT devices, and has released two patches; however, the patches do not (and cannot) remove the vulnerability, which would require key replacements in end user firmware to fix.

On March 1st, 2023, researchers from ESET Cybersecurity Firm reported “The first in-the-wild UEFI bootkit bypassing UEFI Secure Boot” named ‘BlackLotus’ in their public analyses findings describing the theory behind it’s mechanics exploiting the patches that “do not (and cannot) remove the vulnerability”.

Many Linux distributions support UEFI Secure Boot now, such as RHEL (RHEL 7 and later), CentOS (CentOS 7 and later), Ubuntu, Fedora, Debian (Debian 10 and later), OpenSUSE, SUSE Linux.

Firmware problems 
The increased prominence of UEFI firmware in devices has also led to a number of technical problems blamed on their respective implementations.

Following the release of Windows 8 in late 2012, it was discovered that certain Lenovo computer models with Secure Boot had firmware that was hardcoded to allow only executables named "Windows Boot Manager" or "Red Hat Enterprise Linux" to load, regardless of any other setting. Other problems were encountered by several Toshiba laptop models with Secure Boot that were missing certain certificates required for its proper operation.

In January 2013, a bug surrounding the UEFI implementation on some Samsung laptops was publicized, which caused them to be bricked after installing a Linux distribution in UEFI mode. While potential conflicts with a kernel module designed to access system features on Samsung laptops were initially blamed (also prompting kernel maintainers to disable the module on UEFI systems as a safety measure), Matthew Garrett discovered that the bug was actually triggered by storing too many UEFI variables to memory, and that the bug could also be triggered under Windows under certain conditions. In conclusion, he determined that the offending kernel module had caused kernel message dumps to be written to the firmware, thus triggering the bug.

See also 
 OpenBIOS
 UEFI Platform Initialization (UEFI PI)
 Advanced Configuration and Power Interface (ACPI)
 System Management BIOS (SMBIOS)
 Trusted Platform Module (TPM)
 UEFITool

Notes

References

Further reading

External links 

 
 UEFI Specifications
 Intel-sponsored open-source EFI Framework initiative
 Intel EFI/UEFI portal
 Microsoft UEFI Support and Requirements for Windows Operating Systems
 How Windows 8 Hybrid Shutdown / Fast Boot feature works
 Securing the Windows 10 Boot Process
 LoJax: First UEFI rootkit found in the wild, courtesy of the Sednit group

 
Articles with example C code